At least seven United States Navy ships have been named Alabama, after the southern state of Alabama.

 , a 74-gun ship of the line, laid down in 1819, though never completed as such. She was eventually launched in 1864 as the storeship USS New Hampshire.
 , a sidewheel steamer transferred to the Navy in 1849 that served as a troop transport during the Mexican–American War.
 , a sidewheel steamer merchant vessel that was commissioned in 1861 during the American Civil War.
 , a pre-dreadnought battleship commissioned in 1900 and scrapped in 1924.
 , a 69-foot motor boat inspected by the Navy in the summer of 1917 and assigned the designation SP-1052.
 , a  battleship commissioned in 1942, converted to a museum ship in 1964 and now docked in Mobile, Alabama.
 , an  currently in service.

Fictional
 USS Alabama was the French title for the film Crimson Tide, which was set on the eponymous submarine.

See also
 
 
, the merchant ship involved in a 2009 piracy incident

Sources

United States Navy ship names